Enizemum is a genus of parasitoid wasps belonging to the family Ichneumonidae.

The species of this genus are found in Europe and Northern America.

Species:
 Enizemum albiscutellum Ma, Wang & Wang, 1992
 Enizemum carmenae Gauld & Hanson, 1997

References

Ichneumonidae
Ichneumonidae genera